The Venetian Triangular Castle is a castle near Butrint. The castle is located by the Channel of Vivari and by the nearby Butrint National Park. In 1572 when the wars between Venice and the Ottomans had been occurring this left Butrint and its acropolis was abandoned. This led to the creation of The Castle which was built in the 15th century by the Venetians. The castle was created to defend the fishing traps which was a very important source of food and income for the nearby settlement. The castle became seized by the Ottomans once in 1655 and 1718 after then being recaptured by the Venetians.

See also
 Butrint
 Butrint National Park
Venetian Acropolis Castle
 Lake Butrint
 Channel of Vivari
 List of castles in Albania
 Tourism in Albania
 History of Albania

References

Castles in Albania
Venetian fortifications
Buildings and structures in Sarandë
Venetian rule in the Ionian Islands